"Why Lady Why" is a song written by Teddy Gentry and Rick Scott, and recorded by American country music band Alabama.  It was released in August 1980 as the fourth and final single from the album My Home's in Alabama.  The song was the group's second No. 1 song on the Billboard magazine Hot Country Singles chart.

History
Originally, "Why Lady Why" was recorded and released on the band's independent release, ALABAMA BAND: # 3 in 1978.  A snippet of the track was issued as the B-side to the song "My Home's in Alabama," released by MDJ Records in January 1980. When the band signed with MDJ records and started working with producer Harold Shedd, the original track was remixed and Kristin Wilkinson & the WIRE CHOIR's strings were added. The song later was issued as a single in its own right by RCA in August 1980. The B-side: "I Wanna Come Over," the band's first Top 40 hit.

Personnel
Original Session, LSI Studios, 1978:

Randy Owen - Lead Vocal, Rhythm Guitar

Jeff Cook - Harmony Vocal, electric lead guitar, Piano

Teddy Gentry - Harmony Vocal, Bass Guitar

Rick Scott - Drums, Percussion

Arliss Scott - Rhythm Guitar

Harold Shedd's production addition, MUSIC MILL, 1979:

Kristin Wilkinson and the Wire Choir - String Orchestra

Single and album versions
The single and album versions are noticeably different. The single version — which is included on Alabama's For the Record — can be distinguished by an edited shorter introduction, abridged or deleted musical interludes, an edited musical outro, and a noticeably different EQ mix . The original album version is part of Alabama's 1986 Greatest Hits album.

Chart performance

References

Morris, Edward, "Alabama," Contemporary Books Inc., Chicago, 1985
Whitburn, Joel, "Top Country Songs: 1944-2005," 2006.
[ Allmusic — Why Lady Why by Alabama].

1980 singles
Alabama (American band) songs
Song recordings produced by Harold Shedd
RCA Records singles
Songs written by Teddy Gentry
1980 songs